Kosančić may refer to:

 Kosančić, Bojnik, village in the municipality of Bojnik, Serbia
 Kosančić, Vrbas, village in the municipality of Vrbas, Serbia
 Ivan Kosančić (died 1389), Serbian knight